Untsukulsky District is an administrative and municipal district (raion), one of the forty-one in the Republic of Dagestan, Russia. It is located in the center of the republic. Its administrative center is the rural locality (a selo) of Untsukul. As of the 2010 Census, the total population of the district was 29,547, with the population of Untsukul accounting for 21.2% of that number.

Administrative and municipal status
Within the framework of administrative divisions, Untsukulsky District is one of the forty-one in the Republic of Dagestan. It is divided into one settlement (an administrative division with the administrative center in the urban-type settlement (an inhabited locality) of Shamilkala) and six selsoviets, which comprise twenty rural localities. As a municipal division, the district is incorporated as Untsukulsky Municipal District. The settlement is incorporated as an urban settlement, and the six selsoviets are incorporated as eleven rural settlements within the municipal district. The selo of Untsukul serves as the administrative center of both the administrative and municipal district.

References

Notes

Sources

Districts of Dagestan
